Nemce is a village and municipality in Banská Bystrica District in the Banská Bystrica Region of central Slovakia.

History
In historical records the village was first mentioned in 1473.

Geography
The municipality lies at an altitude of 410 metres and covers an area of 4.102 km². It has a population of about 1,107 people.

References

External links
www.nemce.sk

Villages and municipalities in Banská Bystrica District